The City Park is a public park close to the centre of Budapest, Hungary. Its main entrance is at Heroes' Square (Hősök tere), one of Hungary's World Heritage sites.

Map 

Updated Map 2022

Name
The area was formerly called Ökör-dűlő, meaning "Oxmeadow". The first mention of the name comes from 1241 in the archaic form, Ukurföld. In the 18th century, the area was called Ochsenried in German. Around 1800 the official name was changed to Batthyány-erdő (Batthyány Forest) after its tenants, the Batthyány family. The first trees and planified walkways were established in 1751 and after the public park was created in the first decades of the 19th century the present-day name, Városliget (and its German version, Stadtwäldchen, lit.: "little city forest") was accepted and it became one of the first public parks in the world.

History
The City Park was the main venue of the 1896 millennium celebrations of Hungary, by which time Andrássy Avenue, Millennium Underground and the Grand Boulevard had been built.  Városliget (Budapest City Park) museum additions and renewal Liget Project

Sports

The park hosted motorsport events in the 1950s.

Main sights

City Park includes the following sights:
 Vajdahunyad Castle, opened in 1896
 Széchenyi thermal bath
 Budapest Zoo, including the Elephant House
 Municipal Circus, opened in 1891
 Gundel Restaurant, opened in 1894
 Budapest Circus Building
 House of Music, Hungary opened January 2022
 Museum of Ethnography, opened 23 May 2022

See also
 People's Park (Népliget)
 Margaret Island (Margitsziget)

References

External links 

 Budapest Page on Városliget

 
Zugló
Parks in Budapest